The Rose Historic Chapel, formerly known as the St Mary's Convent Chapel, is a heritage-listed stone church building located in Colombo Street in Christchurch, New Zealand. It is registered as a "Historic Place  – Category II " by the New Zealand Historic Places Trust. The building was designed in the Gothic Revival style and erected in 1910.

History
The first Bishop of Christchurch, John Grimes (1842–1915), arrived in Christchurch in February 1888. He provided leadership to the Catholic community, and worked towards uniting the class differences, political opinions and different nationalities of the settlers. During his reign, many churches and buildings were constructed, including the Sisters of Mercy St Mary's Convent. For his silver jubilee as a bishop, he was invested with several ecclesiastical honours for his contributions.

The Sisters of Mercy arrived in Christchurch in 1894, when under the guidance of Mother Mary Bernard (1810/1811?–1895), St Marys Parish School and Convent was established. The chapel, built in 1910, is the last remaining building of the St Mary's Convent, the rest of the complex having been demolished in 1994. The chapel was designed by the brothers Alfred Edgar Luttrell and Edward Sidney Luttrell; this was their first commission by the Diocese of Christchurch and they became their unofficial diocesan architects, designing many more churches and other buildings.

It was purchased by the Christchurch City Council, who renovated the building in association with the Rose Chapel Trust and Friends of the Chapel. The chapel was damaged during the 2011 Christchurch earthquake.

Heritage listing
On 14 July 1995, the chapel was registered by the New Zealand Historic Places Trust as a Category II historic place, with the registration number being 7239. The chapel is significant for its aesthetics (especially the stained glass windows), its architecture (the Luttrell brothers are known for their well designed churches), cultural importance (as a religious teaching place) and spiritual life for the nuns.

References

External links

The Rose Historic Chapel

Gothic Revival church buildings in New Zealand
Churches in Christchurch
Heritage New Zealand Category 2 historic places in Canterbury, New Zealand
Churches completed in 1910
2011 Christchurch earthquake
Former churches in New Zealand
Listed churches in New Zealand
1910s architecture in New Zealand
Roman Catholic churches completed in 1910
Stone churches in New Zealand